The Mentawai language is an Austronesian language, spoken by the Mentawai people of the Mentawai Islands, West Sumatra, Indonesia.

Dialects
According to Ethnologue, Mentawai dialects include: Silabu, Sipura – Simalegi, Sakalagan, Saumanganja – North Siberut, South Siberut – Taikaku – Pagai.

Syamsir Arifin, et al. (1992) list twelve dialects of Mentawai:
South Siberut
Madobat
Salappa
Ulubaga
Sipora
Bariulou
Bosua
Sioban
North Pagai
Pasapuat
Silabu
Saumanganya
South Pagai
Boriai
Bulasat
Sikakap

Dialects in Siberut Island are:
Sikapone
Togiiite
Pokai
Simajegi
Simatalu
Paipajet
Sakuddei
Sagulubbe
Sirileleu
Sikabaluan
Sempungan
Saibi & Sarabua
Silaoinan
Sarareiket
Sabirut

Phonology

Consonants 

 Allophones of /b ɡ k/ can be heard as [β ɣ ʔ]. [t͡ɕ] is a distinct sound in Mentawai, but not given phoneme status by Syamsir et al. because of the lack of minimal contrasts.
 The semivowels /w j/ only appear in final position.

Vowels

References

Bibliography

 
 

Languages of Indonesia
Northwest Sumatra–Barrier Islands languages